Nikos Lorentzos is a Greek professor of Informatics. He is a specialist on the Relational Model of Database Management, having made contributions in the field of temporal databases, where he has co-authored a book with Hugh Darwen and Christopher J Date.

Bibliography 
  422 pages.

Living people
Year of birth missing (living people)